Undocumented may refer to:
Undocumented (film), a 2010 horror thriller
The Undocumented, a documentary film by Marco Williams

See also 
Undocumented feature, in software releases
Undocumented flying object
Undocumented immigrant, an immigrant into a country who is in violation of the immigration laws of that country.